Francesco Merloni (born 17 September 1925) is an Italian industrialist, engineer and politician who was a member of the Christian Democrats. He served as the minister of public works from 1992 to 1994. He chaired Merloni Termosanitari until 2011.

Early life and education
Merloni hails from a family who founded the Merloni group and created the brand, Ariston, among the others. He was born in Fabriano on 17 September 1925. He holds a degree in industrial engineering from the University of Pisa in 1953.

Career
After graduation Merloni began his career in the family company, Merloni, in 1954 and worked there until 1972. From 1972 to 1998 he was elected to the Italian senate. He was a Christian Democrat senator until 1992. He also served as a member of the Parliament. In the elections of 1976, 1979, 1983 and 1987 he was elected deputy with the Christian Democrats.

He was the public works minister in the cabinet led by Prime Minister Giuliano Amato from 28 June 1992 to 27 April 1993. He retained his post in the next cabinet led by Prime Minister Carlo Azeglio Ciampi from 28 April 1993 to 9 May 1994. In the general elections in 1996, he was elected to the Parliament with the Olive Tree Alliance.

He led the Ariston Thermo Group until 2011. He is the honorary chairman of the group. In addition, he is the president of the Aristide Merloni Foundation, the national president of the UCID (Christian Union of Entrepreneurs and Managers) and vice president of AREL (Research and Legislation Agency).

Personal life
Merloni married Cecilia Lazzarini, and they have three children. Merloni's son, Paolo, is also a businessman.

Honors and awards
Merloni was awarded the Knight Grand Cross Order of Merit of the Italian Republic in 1994. He was honored by Prix France Italie as best Italian entrepreneur of the year in France in 2003.

References

External links

20th-century Italian businesspeople
20th-century Italian engineers
21st-century Italian businesspeople
21st-century Italian engineers
1925 births
Christian Democracy (Italy) politicians
Deputies of Legislature VII of Italy
Deputies of Legislature VIII of Italy
Deputies of Legislature IX of Italy
Deputies of Legislature X of Italy
Deputies of Legislature XIII of Italy
Italian Ministers of Public Works
Industrial engineers
Italian corporate directors
Italian People's Party (1994) politicians
Knights Grand Cross of the Order of Merit of the Italian Republic
Living people
People from Fabriano
Politicians of Marche
Senators of Legislature VI of Italy
Senators of Legislature XI of Italy
University of Pisa alumni